David John Laitt (born 1 November 1946) is an English former footballer who played in the Football League as a full-back for Colchester United.

Career

Born in Colchester, Laitt joined hometown club Colchester United as an apprentice from local amateur team Colchester Casuals. He made one appearance for the U's in the Football League during a 0–0 Fourth Division home draw with Southport on 30 October 1965. He came on as a 40th-minute substitute for Reg Stratton. He failed to make any further appearances for the first-team, signing for Crittall Athletic following his release from the club.

References

1946 births
Living people
Sportspeople from Colchester
English footballers
Association football fullbacks
Colchester United F.C. players
Braintree Town F.C. players
English Football League players